Rostam Bazar Nalant (also Romanized as Rostam Bāzār Nalant) is a village in Bahu Kalat Rural District, Dashtiari District, Chabahar County, Sistan and Baluchestan Province, Iran. At the 2006 census, its population was 131, in 44 families.

References 

Populated places in Chabahar County